This is a list of people who have served as Vice-Admiral of Lancashire.

Lancashire and Cheshire
Edward Stanley, 3rd Earl of Derby bef. 1569–1572
Henry Stanley, 4th Earl of Derby 1573–1593
Ferdinando Stanley, 5th Earl of Derby 1593–1594
vacant
William Stanley, 6th Earl of Derby bef. 1606–1638
James Stanley, 7th Earl of Derby 1638–?

Lancashire
John Moore 1644–1650 (Parliamentary)
Interregnum
Charles Stanley, 8th Earl of Derby 1661–1672  (also Vice-Admiral of Cheshire)
William Banks 1673–1676 (also Vice-Admiral of Cheshire)
vacant
William Stanley, 9th Earl of Derby 1684–1691  (also Vice-Admiral of Cheshire)
Charles Gerard, 2nd Earl of Macclesfield 1691–1701  (also Vice-Admiral of Cheshire)
Richard Savage, 4th Earl Rivers 1702  (also Vice-Admiral of Cheshire)
James Stanley, 10th Earl of Derby 1702–1712
James Douglas-Hamilton, 4th Duke of Hamilton 1712
vacant
Edward Stanley, 13th Earl of Derby 1831–1851

References
Institute of Historical Research

Military ranks of the United Kingdom
Lincolnshire
Vice Admiral
Vice Admiral